Listed below are the 1999 UCI Women's Teams that competed in 1999 women's road cycling events organized by the International Cycling Union (UCI).

Source:

References

1999
UCI Women
UCI Women